Dehydrosecodine is a terpene indole alkaloid. The compound is believed to be an unstable O-acetylated secodine type intermediate in the formation of catharanthine and tabersonine from stemmadenine. The enzymes involved forming dehydrosecodine or utilizing it as a substrate for further chemical reactions are currently unknown.

References

Tryptamine alkaloids
Methyl esters